Calimani is a surname. Notable people with this surname include:

Attilio Calimani, Italian inventor who patented the French press
Simchah ben Abraham Calimani (1699–1784), Venetian rabbi and author
Riccardo Calimani (born 1946) Italian writer and historian

See also
Caliman
Kaliman (disambiguation)